Michael Scott Schwabe (born July 12, 1964) is an American retired pitcher in Major League Baseball who played for the Detroit Tigers in 1989 and 1990.  Prior to being drafted in the 1987 amateur draft, Schwabe played for Arizona State University.

References

1964 births
Living people
Major League Baseball pitchers
Baseball players from Iowa
Detroit Tigers players
Sportspeople from Fort Dodge, Iowa
Santa Ana Dons baseball players
Arizona State Sun Devils baseball players
Fayetteville Generals players
Lakeland Tigers players
Bristol Tigers players
Glens Falls Tigers players
Toledo Mud Hens players
London Tigers players
Orlando Sun Rays players
Portland Beavers players